Trosia zikani is a moth of the family Megalopygidae. It was described by Walter Hopp in 1922. This moth is found in Brazil.

The wingspan is 35 mm. The wings are semi-hyaline grey-brown with darker veins.

References

Moths described in 1922
Megalopygidae